Charles Joseph Leicester Stanhope, 10th Earl of Harrington MC, DL (9 October 1887 – 16 November 1929), was a British captain and peer.

He was the son of Dudley Stanhope, 9th Earl of Harrington, and Kathleen Wood. He succeeded in the earldom on the death of his father on 13 November 1928.

Harrington was a captain in the 15th Hussars, Reserve of Officers and was awarded the Military Cross. He also served as a Deputy Lieutenant of Derbyshire.

Family
Harrington married Margaret Trelawney Seaton, daughter of Major H. H. D. Seaton, on 23 April 1919. They had two children:

Charles Stanhope (19 January 1921 – 23 January 1921)
William Henry Leicester Stanhope, 11th Earl of Harrington (24 August 1922 – 12 April 2009)

Lord Harrington died on 16 November 1929 at age 42.

References

Books cited

External links

1887 births
1929 deaths
10
Recipients of the Military Cross
Deputy Lieutenants of Derbyshire
British Army personnel of World War I
15th The King's Hussars officers
Charles